The Cathedral Basilica of the Assumption or Pelplin Abbey is a former Cistercian abbey, located in Pelplin, Poland, to the south of Gdańsk.

History
It was founded in 1258 by Sambor II, Duke of Pomerania, as "Samboria", and was a daughter house of the Cistercian Doberan Abbey. It was first sited in Pogódki (Pogutken) near Kościerzyna (Berent) and re-located in 1276 to Pelplin. By decree of the Prussian government of 5 March 1823 it was dissolved. Since 1824 the church, as Pelplin Cathedral, has been until 1992 the cathedral of the Diocese of Chelmno, and since then of the new Diocese of Pelplin.

Main building 
Work on the Brick Gothic building (length 80 m, height 26 m) began in 1289. The church was finished in 1323; additional work was completed in 1557. Currently, it is one of the largest church buildings in Poland. The cathedral is known as an impressive early example of Northern German Brick Gothic architecture. In Pelpin, the architecture has also been influenced by Cistercian tradition.

References

Antoni, Michael, 1993: Dehio-Handbuch der Kunstdenkmäler, West- und Ostpreußen, pp. 469–473 (with plan). Munich and Berlin: Deutscher Kunstverlag.  
Binding, Günther, Untermann, Matthias, 2001: Kleine Kunstgeschichte der mittelalterlichen Ordensbaukunst in Deutschland, 3rd edn., p. 222 (with plan). Darmstadt: Wissenschaftliche Buchgesellschaft Darmstadt. No ISBN 
Dehio, Georg, 1922: Handbuch der Deutschen Kunstdenkmäler, Zweiter Band Nordostdeutschland, 2nd edn., pp 362 ff. (edited by Julius Kohte). Berlin: Ernst Wasmuth A.G. 
Faryna-Paszkiewicz, Hanna; Omilanowska, Małgorzata; Pasieczny, Robert, 2001: Atlas zabytków architektury w Polsce, p. 44. Warsaw: Wydawnictwo Naukowe PWN. 
Pasierb, Janusz, 1993: Der Pelpliner Dom, Pelplin Diözesanverlag. No ISBN
Schneider, Ambrosius, 1986: Lexikale Übersicht der Männerklöster der Cistercienser im deutschen Sprach- und Kulturraum, in: Schneider, Ambrosius; Wienand, Adam; Bickel, Wolfgang; Coester, Ernst (eds.): Die Cistercienser, Geschichte – Geist – Kunst, 3rd edn., p. 683. Cologne: Wienand Verlag.

External links
  Photos and history of Pelplin Cathedral

Cistercian monasteries in Poland
1258 establishments in Europe
Basilica churches in Poland
Tczew County
Buildings and structures in Pomeranian Voivodeship
Pelplin
Pelplin
13th-century establishments in Poland